"Tessaracoccus massiliensis" is a Gram-positive, facultatively anaerobic, rod-shaped, non-spore-forming and non-motile bacterium from the genus Tessaracoccus which has been isolated from the human gut of a Nigerian child suffering from kwashiorkor.

References 

Propionibacteriales
Bacteria described in 2016